The Rugby League World Cup qualification is the process a national team goes through to qualify for the World Cup Finals.

There was no qualification for the tournament before the 2000 World Cup as teams were invited to participate. The Big Three Australia, New Zealand and England automatically gain entry to each World Cup as the RLIF want new nations to participate. Host nations and teams reaching the World Cup quarter finals also do not need to participate in qualifying.

Teams

Bold- Automatically qualified or were invited to participate

First appearance in qualification by team

See also

References

External links

Rugby League World Cup